McCants is a surname. Notable people with the surname include:

Allen McCants (1875–1953), American football player and coach
Darnerien McCants (born 1978), Canadian football player
Ed McCants (born 1981), American basketball player
Elliott Crayton McCants (1865–1953), American author
Keith McCants (1968–2021), American football player
Mark McCants (born 1958), American football player
Matt McCants (born 1989), American football player
Mel McCants (born 1967), American basketball player
Rashad McCants (born 1984), American basketball player
Rashanda McCants (born 1986), American women's basketball player
Thomas McCants Stewart (1853–1923), American academic and lawyer
Tom McCants (born 1962), American high jumper
Will McCants (born 1975), American academic

See also
McCants Stewart (1877–1919), American lawyer